Sean Kenney may refer to:

 Sean Kenney (actor) (born 1944), American actor
 Sean Kenney (artist) (born 1976), New York-based artist

See also
Seán Kenny (disambiguation)